The American Samoa national rugby sevens team has competed in the Pacific Games; they finished in 5th place at the 2011 Pacific Games. American Samoa finished in fifth place at the 2013 Oceania Sevens Championship which gave the opportunity to compete for the World Series core team qualifier at the 2014 Hong Kong Sevens.

Players
Squad to the 2014 Hong Kong Sevens World Series Qualifier.

Feite Okesene (c)
Kamilo Soi
Iakopo Atonio
Nikikata Lua
Pentateuch Vaki
Tesimale Seve
Joseph Poyer
Tavita Silva
Maugalei Veavea
Taisamoa Patrick Ng-Lam
Ryan Pa'aga
Taligau Tauese

Pacific Games

See also

Rugby union in American Samoa
American Samoa national rugby union team

References

External links
Official Site for Amerika Samoa Rugby Union

Rugby union in American Samoa
American Samoa national rugby union team
National rugby sevens teams